Anita Sengupta is an American aerospace engineer. She is a graduate in aerospace and mechanical engineering (MS '00, Ph.D. '05) of the Viterbi School of Engineering at the University of Southern California. She was the lead systems engineer of the team that developed the parachute system that was deployed during the landing of Mars Science Laboratory Curiosity. She was subsequently the project manager of the Cold Atom Laboratory at the Jet Propulsion Laboratory at Caltech. She was then the Senior Vice President of Systems Engineering at Virgin Hyperloop One. She is currently Chief Product Officer at Airspace Experience Technologies (ASX).

Early life
Sengupta was born in Glasgow, Scotland before emigrating to New York where she was raised thereafter. Her father hailed from West Bengal, India, and was a mechanical engineer from the Indian Institute of Technology. Her British mother was an expert in French and German. Her parents met while pursuing a PhD at the University of Liverpool. From as young as age six, Sengupta admits being hooked on Star Trek character Spock, and his adventures on board a 23rd-century starship.

Cold Atom Laboratory
Anita Sengupta was the CAL Project Manager.
CAL is a facility for the study of ultra-cold quantum gases in the microgravity environment of the International Space Station (ISS). It will enable research in a temperature regime and  environment that is inaccessible to terrestrial laboratories. In the microgravity environment, up to 20 second long interaction times and as low as 1 picokelvin temperatures are achievable, unlocking the potential to observe new quantum phenomena. The CAL facility is designed for use by multiple scientific investigators and to be upgradable/maintainable on orbit. CAL will also be a pathfinder experiment for future quantum sensors based on laser cooled atoms.

CAL was scheduled to launch in 2016 on a Pressurized Cargo Vehicle in soft-stowage. After docking with ISS the CAL payload was to be installed by astronauts into an EXPRESS (EXpedite the PRocessing of Experiments to Space Station) rack inside the space station. The EXPRESS rack provides a standardized power, data, thermal, and mechanical interface to scientific payloads. CAL was to occupy a quad locker space due to its size and power requirements. Following installation the payload will be operated remotely via sequence control from the Jet Propulsion Laboratory. The initial mission was planned to have a duration of 12 months with up to five years of extended operation.

See also
Adam Steltzner
Bobak Ferdowsi

References

American women engineers
American aerospace engineers
Women aerospace engineers
NASA people
Jet Propulsion Laboratory
USC Viterbi School of Engineering alumni
Scottish emigrants to the United States
Year of birth missing (living people)
Living people